BK Mladá Boleslav is a Czech ice hockey team, which plays in the Czech Extraliga, the country's highest level. They were promoted into the league on 18 April 2014 after a two-year absence. They play their home games at Ško-Energo Aréna.

History

2000-12: Extraliga
In 2000 and 2001, Mladá Boleslav won the 2nd national hockey league, and in 2008 they won the 1st national hockey league. In that year, they joined the Extraliga, after winning a promotion-relegation play-off against HC Slovan Ústečtí Lvi.
In each of its first three seasons in the Czech Extraliga, Mladá Boleslav had to win a best-of-seven promotion-relegation play-off to stay in the top league, beating Slovan Ústečtí Lvi 4-3 in the last of them.

During the 2010–2011 season, the team was docked 22 points for using players not correctly registered to the club, an affair which also involved HC Plzeň and HC Kladno. An appeal against the penalty was turned down. The club was later fined 3 million Czech crowns in a separate matter in which its administration was ruled to have deliberately withheld information concerning club debt.

In September 2011, locally born Radim Vrbata of the NHL's Vancouver Canucks, bought a 33% share in the club, which he held until 2015.

In April 2012 the club finished in last place and lost the subsequent promotion-relegation play-off against Piráti Chomutov in seven games. The club was therefore relegated from the Extraliga to the 1st League.

2012-14: 1st League and promotion battles
Coach František Výborný, father of the team's captain David, was hired as coach for the 2012–2013 season. The club finished the league phase of that season in first place with 117 points from 52 games.

For the 2012/13 a new system for promotion and relegation between the Extraliga and the 1st League was implemented, involving the two lowest-placed teams from the Extraliga and the two highest teams from the 1st League. Each team would meet each other team twice at home and twice away, each playing 12 games in total. Points would be awarded in the same way as in the regular season (3 points for a win in regulation, 2 points for a win in overtime, 1 point for an overtime loss, and 0 points for a regulation loss). Since both semi-finalists would enter the promotion/relegation play-off, the 1st League championship final was omitted. However, BK Mladá Boleslav, as the winning semi-finalist with the better regular season record, secured the championship trophy ahead of the other semi-finalist HC Olomouc. The other teams in the play-offs were Piráti Chomutov and Bílí Tygři Liberec.

BK Mladá Boleslav began the play-off with two away losses, 1-2 in Chomutov and 0-3 in Olomouc. However, they won the next 3 matches, all at home, defeating Liberec 7-3, Chomutov 4-3 after a shoot-out, and finally Olomouc 4-2. Their poor form then returned, losing to Chomutov 1-2 and Liberec 1-4 before their only away victory of the play-offs, 3-1 in Olomouc. The team then won their next 3 home games, over Liberec (7-0), Chomutov (5-0), and Olomouc (2-1). At this point Mladá Boleslav, Chomutov and Liberec were equal on 20 points each with one game remaining. Mladá Boleslav lost 0-2 to Liberec in the final game. After this game BK Mladá Boleslav's management submitted an official protest to the league's governing body over a number of controversial umpiring decisions during the match, but the league commission rejected all three appeals, and Piráti Chomutov and Bílí Tigři Liberec therefore remained in the Extraliga for the 2013/14 season, and BK Mladá Boleslav and HC Olomouc remained in the První Liga.

Coach František Výborný confirmed that he would remain with the club for a second season. Mladá Bolelav began the 2013/14 season with a home game against Draci Šumperk on September 11.

The club finished the 2013/2014 regular season in first place with 126 points. In the first round of the play-offs they defeated local rivals Benátky nad Jizerou 4-2 in a best-of-seven series ending on March 3, 2014. They defeated their semi-final opponent HC Horácká Slavia Třebíč by 4-0, qualifying for the play-offs for a second year in a row. The two Extraliga participants were Rytíři Kladno and Piráti Chomutov, along with HC Olomouc, also for a second season in succession. On 18 April 2014, despite losing to Olomouc 5-4 in overtime, Mladá Boleslav won their return to the Extraliga for the 2014/15 season after a two-year absence.

2014-present: Back in the Extraliga
The 2014/2015 season saw the club reach the Extraliga play-offs for the first time. After finishing tenth in the league phase, they defeated Plzeň in four games in the best-of-five preliminary round before losing to eventual runners-up HC Oceláři Třinec in five games in the best-of-seven quarter-final. After this successful season for the team, coach František Výborný and assistant coach Marian Jelínek both signed new two-year contracts with the club.

In the 2015/16 season the team finished the regular season in sixth place, qualifying directly for the quarter-finals. Their opponent was HK Mountfield Hradec Králové. In the first game of the series captain David Výborný suffered a career-ending knee injury. He has since become the sporting manager of the club. The team went on to win the series in 6 games, progressing to a semi-final against the regular season winner HC Bílí Tygří Liberec, who won in a series sweep.

Players

Current roster

References

External links
 Official website

Mlada Boleslav
Mlada Boleslav
Sport in Mladá Boleslav
Ice hockey clubs established in 1908
1908 establishments in Austria-Hungary
20th-century establishments in Bohemia